The double chapel, sometimes double church, is a chapel or church building with two storeys that either have a central aperture enabling their simultaneous use for services or are completely separate, just connected by a staircase, and used for different liturgical functions. In the latter type, there is often a crypt on the lower level and a celebratory space on the upper floor.

Architecture 
This special form of church building that was used in medieval European architecture up to the 13th century had two churches built on two levels, one above the other, usually with the same floor plan, but there are exceptions such as the Imperial Chapel of St. Ulrich in Goslar.
The earlier arrangement of the two chapel floors, which was purported to enable a "separation between the lower and upper classes of the Middle Ages", in which the lower chapel was assigned to the "common people" and the upper chapel to the "feudal lords" and their families is not substantiated by any evidence. Instead, it is more likely that the distinction was either between a public lower chapel, where the ruler celebrated mass with guests before official events or during state visits, and a private upper chapel, where the lord’s family worshipped; or between an upper chapel which was reserved for estate services and a lower chapel used as a crypt and also for requiem masses. In these Romanesque chapels the upper and lower levels were usually connected by a secondary aperture in the floor of the upper chapel.
The double chapel had numerous architectural successors, notably the charnel house, a combination of cemetery chapel and ossuary, but also in numerous two-storey cemetery chapels in southern Germany, Austria and Bohemia. Where they function purely as cemetery chapels,  double chapels are usually dedicated to Saint Michael. The lower chapel was given the character of an ossuary, as a Late Gothic relic chapel and memorial for the fallen after the failure of the feudal crusades (e.g. Kiedrich or Görlitz).

Examples 
Germany:

Double chapels were mainly built in Hohenstaufen imperial palaces and castles, but also in monasteries. The best known are:

 St. Michael's in Fulda the earliest known example in Germany
 Palace chapel of St. Gotthard at Mainz Cathedral, a court chapel in its most ostentatious
 Chapel of St. Crucis above the town of Landsberg, the only surviving building in the old Landsberg Castle
 Goslar's Imperial Chapel of St. Ulrich
 Chapel of the Kaiserburg at Nuremberg Castle
 Chapel at Neuenburg Castle above Freyburg, a  four-post room based on a Byzantine prototype
 Double Chapel at Rheda Castle (Westphalia), a simple unsupported room
 Chapel at Trifels Castle in a Romanesque bergfried
 Chapel at Lohra Castle
 Double Chapel of St. Emmeram and St. Catharine in Speyer Cathedral
 Double Chapel of St. Nicholas in Nienburg on the Saale
 Chapel in the Dominican church in Eisenach
 Chapel in St. Ludger's Abbey in Helmstedt
 St. Nicholas' Chapel in the imperial palace in Kaiserslautern
 Chapel of St. Erasmus (St. Erasmus and St. Michael) in Kempten
 Double Chapel of St. Trinitatis and Johannes Nepomuk at Breitenstein Castle
 Double Chapel of the Holy Rood (after 1465) at the  Heiliges Grab in Görlitz with the Chapel of St. Adam on the lower level and the Golgatha Chapel on the upper floor
 Michaelskapelle (1444) mit Karner in Kiedrich (Rheingau)
 Double Church of St. Clemens in Schwarzrheindorf 
 Former double church of St. Symeon at the Porta Nigra in Trier with the grave of Saint Symeon in the lower chapel
 St. Catharine's Chapel at Greifenstein Castle in Hesse with a Gothic lower floor, was created during work to convert the church to the Baroque style

Rest of Europe
 Bishop's chapel, Hereford, in England (1079–95) the oldest surviving example of two chapels linked by an aperture in the floor
 Double Chapel at Eger Castle in Bohemia
 Double Chapel of St. Ulrich and St. Nicholas in the Benedictine abbey of St. John in Graubünden
 Double Chapel at Vianden Castle in Vianden, Luxembourg
 The Sainte-Chapelle in Paris, originally part of the royal palace, where the king's private chapel housed a collection of relics (removed during the French Revolution) and the lower chapel served as the parish church for the residents of the palace.

Armenia
 Original St. Rhipsime's Church in Vagharshapat, late 4th century
 First basilica for Mesrop Mashtots in Oshakan, mid-5th century
 Mother of God's Church (Surb Astvatsatsin) in Yeghvard, early 14th century
 Mother of God's Church (Surb Astvatsatsin) in Noravank Abbey dating to 1331–1339
 Basilica of Kaputan (near Abovyan), dated to 1349

See also 
 Double church

Literature 
 Gerhard Strauss; Harald Olbrich (ed.): Lexikon der Kunst. Architektur, bildende Kunst, angewandte Kunst, Industrieformgestaltung, Kunsttheorie. E. A. Seemann, Leipzig, 1989, Vol. 2 (Cin–Gree), pp. 193 f.
 Mathias Haenchen: Die mittelalterliche Baugeschichte der Goslarer Pfalzkapelle St. Ulrich. Diss. TU Braunschweig 1998, Brunswick, 1998
 Oscar Schürer: Romanische Doppelkapellen. Eine typengeschichtliche Untersuchung. In: Marburger Jahrbuch für Kunstwissenschaft 5, 1929, pp. 99–192

External links 

Lists of churches
 
!
Vernacular architecture